Events in the year 2023 in Tunisia.

Incumbents 

 President: Kais Saied
 Prime Minister: Najla Bouden
 President of the Assembly of the Representatives by the People: Rached Ghannouchi
 Government: Bouden Cabinet

Events 

 6 January - Fadhila Rebhi is sacked as Minister of Trade and Export Development. 
 7 January - Five people are killed and ten others are missing after a boat carrying migrants sinks off the coast of Tunisia.

 29 January - Second round of the Tunisian parliamentary election: Tunisians head to the polls to elect the members of the third Assembly of the Representatives of the People in a run-off. The electoral board reports a voter turnout of 11.3 percent as most opposition parties boycott the election.
 9 March - Fourteen people are killed and 54 others are rescued after a boat carrying migrants sinks off the coast of Tunisia.

Sports 

 2022–23 Tunisian Ligue Professionnelle 1
 2022–23 Espérance Sportive de Tunis season

Deaths

References 

 
2020s in Tunisia
Years of the 21st century in Tunisia
Tunisia
Tunisia